Super Mystery is a 36-volume series of crossover paperbacks, pairing The Hardy Boys with Nancy Drew. Earlier crossovers include a 1970s TV series, the novelization of one of the TV episodes (The Hardy Boys and Nancy Drew Meet Dracula), two SuperSleuths books (each book containing 7 short stories), Campfire Stories (a book of 7 short stories in celebration of the anniversary of the Campfire organization), and the Be-A-Detective series (6 choose-your-own adventure books).

The series is based on the Nancy Drew Files and the Hardy Boys Casefiles universes, as evidenced by Shock Waves, in which the melted keys from the car bombing that killed Iola Morton in the first Hardy Boys Casefile, are mentioned. The books are written under the Keene pseudonym and are told mainly from Nancy's view.  Since 2007, and the re-introduction of the Nancy Drew and the Hardy Boys Super Mystery series based on the "Nancy Drew: Girl Detective" series, many fans have referred to this original crossover series as SuperMystery'88 in order to differentiate the two series. 

An attraction between Frank Hardy and Nancy Drew was mentioned throughout the series.

Series titles

In additions to the titles listed above, two unpublished manuscripts were written. Book #37 was written by Louise Munro Foley and had the working title The Playhouse Mystery. Book #38 was untitled, but listed as forthcoming on an on-line book sales site.

See also
List of Nancy Drew books

References

Merrill, Ashley Christine. The Evolution of Nancy Drew, Cultural Icon: Readers, Writers, and Fanfiction Authors. Master's thesis. North Carolina State University. 2007.

External links
The Nancy Drew and Hardy Boys Super Mysteries at The Hardy Boys Encyclopedia
Nancy Drew & Hardy Boys Super Mysteries at Nancy Drew Sleuth
Hardy Boys Nancy Drew SuperMystery page at Mysterynet.com

Young adult novel series